This is a list of tunnels on Thailand's railway network.

See also

Railway Bridges in Thailand
Thai Railways: Past and Present - Facebook Group
Thai Railway videos, including tunnels

External links
 Railway tunnels in Thailand